Transmembrane protein 117 is a protein that in humans is encoded by the TMEM117 gene.

References

Further reading